The 1894 Oregon gubernatorial election took place on June 4, 1894 to elect the governor of the U.S. state of Oregon. The election matched Republican William Paine Lord, Chief Justice of the Oregon Supreme Court, against Democrat William Galloway and Populist Nathan Pierce.

Results

References

Gubernatorial
1894
Oregon
June 1894 events